Carn an Tuirc ('hill of the wild boar') is a mountain in the Mounth region of the Grampian Mountains, in the Scottish Highlands. It is about two miles from the Glenshee Ski Centre near Braemar.

References

Mountains and hills of Aberdeenshire
Munros
One-thousanders of Scotland